Mecistes seriatus is a species of leaf beetle found in Saudi Arabia, Mozambique, Eswatini and South Africa. It was first described by the French entomologist Édouard Lefèvre in 1885.

References

Eumolpinae
Beetles of Africa
Beetles of Asia
Insects of the Arabian Peninsula
Taxa named by Édouard Lefèvre
Beetles described in 1885